The Willys MC, formally the -Ton, 4 x 4, Utility Truck M38, or the G740 by its U.S. Army Standard Nomenclature supply catalog designation, is a quarter-ton four-wheel drive military light utility vehicle made by Willys between 1949 and 1952. It replaced (in production), and succeeded the World War II Willys MB and Ford GPW models, with a total production of some 50,000 units — less than one tenth the number of WWII models built. Unlike during WWII, Ford was no longer involved in the production.

The M38 was a military version of the then-current civilian Jeep CJ-3A. It differed from the CJ-3A in numerous ways, including a reinforced frame and suspension, waterproof 24-volt electrical system, sealed vent system for the engine, transmission, transfer case, fuel system and brake system. 

Some M38 jeeps served in the Korean theatre of operations, but the majority of units used there were remanufactured World War II jeeps. Approximately 2,300 M38 Jeeps were manufactured by Ford of Canada for Canadian Armed Forces in 1952, designated as the M38-CDN jeep. The M38 Willys MC was succeeded by the M38A1 Willys MD in 1952.

The M38 windshield could be folded flat for firing and the body was equipped with a pintle hook for towing and lifting shackles front and rear. The headlights were no longer recessed as on previous models, but protruded with a guard wire in front. The "pioneer" tools (axe and shovel) which were carried on the MB's driver side were transferred to the passenger side of this vehicle.

Specifications

Wheelbase: 
Length overall:  
Width, minimum: 
Height overall: maximum  with top up; reducible to  
Ground clearance:  at the rear axle
Empty weight: 
Gross vehicle weight:  on road 

Engine
Displacement: 
Bore/Stroke: 
Compression Ratio: 6.48:1
Power:  at 4000 rpm
Torque:  at 2000 rpm
Main Bearings: 3
Carburetor: Carter YS 637S,  downdraft

Powertrain
The entire engine air intake and the axle system was fully vented to allow for operation while submerged under water. Its full-floating front axle (Dana 25) was supported by the wheel hub, rather than the axle itself, and provided greater load capacity. The rear axle (Dana 44) was semi-floating. Its drivetrain was the L-head  with a T-90 transmission and the Dana 18 transfer case.

A few M38 Jeeps were fitted with a transmission power take-off (PTO) driven winch. This feature was not used in regular production models due to increased weight on the front of the vehicle, as well as additional maintenance requirements.

Electrical system
The electrical system was upgraded to a 24 volt system which required dual 12 volt batteries connected in series. Its ignition and electrical systems were waterproof; a valuable feature in rainy environments and where deep river fording was necessary.

See also
 List of U.S. military vehicles by supply catalog designation
 List of U.S. military vehicles by model number
 Jeep trailer (M100)

Notes

Footnotes

Citations

References

General

Technical manuals

External links

 http://www.willysmjeeps.com
 http://www.g503.com/
 http://www.olive-drab.com/idphoto/id_photos_m38.php3

Jeep vehicles
Motor vehicles manufactured in the United States
Military light utility vehicles
M38
Military vehicles introduced from 1945 to 1949
Military trucks of Canada